This is a list of African-American newspapers that have been published in the state of West Virginia.  The first such newspaper was The Pioneer Press of Martinsburg, started by J.R. Clifford in 1882. West Virginia's last African-American newspaper, the West Virginia Beacon Digest of Charleston, shut down in 2006.

Newspapers

See also 
List of African-American newspapers and media outlets
List of African-American newspapers in Maryland
List of African-American newspapers in Ohio
List of African-American newspapers in Pennsylvania
List of African-American newspapers in Virginia
List of newspapers in West Virginia

Works cited

References 

Newspapers
West Virginia
African-American
African-American newspapers